Constituency NA-249 (Karachi-XI) was a constituency for the National Assembly of Pakistan. It mainly comprised the historic Saddar Town neighborhood of Karachi. After the 2018 delimitations, its areas have been divided among the constituencies of NA-246 (Karachi South-I) and NA-247 (Karachi South-II), with NA-247 getting the larger piece. The Garden Subdivision was equally distributed between the two.

Election of 2002 

General elections were held on 10 Oct 2002. Aamir Liaquat Hussain of Muttahida Qaumi Movement won by 30,458 votes.

Election of 2008 

General elections were held on 18 Feb 2008. Farooq Sattar of Muttahida Qaumi Movement won by 103,846 votes.

Election of 2013 

General elections were held on 11 May 2013. Farooq Sattar of Muttahida Qaumi Movement won by 109,952 votes and became the member of National Assembly.

References

External links 
Election result's official website

NA-249
Abolished National Assembly Constituencies of Pakistan